Please Don't Be Dead is the third studio album by American singer-songwriter Fantastic Negrito. The album was released on June 15, 2018. The album won a Grammy Award for Best Contemporary Blues Album at the 61st Grammy Awards.

Critical reception

The album received a Metacritic score of 75 based on 7 critics, indicating generally favorable reviews.

Track listing

Charts

References

2018 albums
Blues albums by American artists
Fantastic Negrito albums